is a Japanese manga artist. She is best known for the manga series Fullmetal Alchemist (2001–2010), which became a hit both domestically and internationally, and was adapted into two anime television series. She is also known for Silver Spoon (2011–2019) and the manga adaptation of The Heroic Legend of Arslan novels.

Biography
Born on May 8, 1973, in Tokachi, Hokkaidō, Japan, Arakawa was born and raised on a dairy farm with three elder sisters and a younger brother. Arakawa thought about being a manga artist ever "since [she] was little" and during her school years, she would often draw on textbooks. After graduating high school, she took oil painting classes once a month for seven years while working on her family's farm. During this time, she also created dōjinshi manga with her friends and drew yonkoma for a magazine.

Arakawa moved to Tokyo in the summer of 1999. She began her career in the manga world as a Square Enix employee and assistant to Hiroyuki Etō, author of Mahōjin Guru Guru. Her own career began with the publication of Stray Dog in Square Enix's Monthly Shōnen Gangan in 1999. Stray Dog won the ninth 21st Century "Shōnen Gangan" Award. She published one chapter of Shanghai Yōmakikai in Monthly Shōnen Gangan in 2000.

In July 2001, Arakawa published the first chapter of Fullmetal Alchemist in Monthly Shōnen Gangan. The series spanned 108 chapters, with the last one published in July 2010, and the series was collected in twenty-seven volumes. Some reviewers say that the combination of Arakawa's art style and the writing in Fullmetal Alchemist contribute to its dark thematic elements. Fullmetal Alchemist has been adapted into two anime series by Bones. When they were creating the first, Arakawa assisted them in its early development. However, she was not involved in the making of the script, so the anime has a different ending from the manga, which she developed further. The series won the 49th Shogakukan Manga Award in the shōnen category in 2004. When the second anime adaptation was reaching its ending, Arakawa showed director Yasuhiro Irie her plans for the manga's ending, making both end in near dates. Most reviewers distinguish between the manga and anime, which they attribute to differences in style and subject matter. One review explains that the manga is more "emotional," whereas the anime is more whimsical. Arakawa's simple, dark style and plot choices contrast with the anime's "cartoony," colorful rendering. Reviews in general tend to ascribe the anime to children and the manga to teens and adults.

Arakawa is married with three children. She gave birth to a daughter in 2007 and had her third child in January 2014.

She is currently living in Tokyo and has published more works, including Raiden-18, Sōten no Kōmori (also known as Bat in Blue Sky), and Hero Tales. Arakawa has collaborated with the creation of Hero Tales with Studio Flag under the name of Huang Jin Zhou. In the anime adaptation of the series, Arakawa was responsible for the character designs. She has also drawn the cover from the Japanese edition of the novel The Demon's Lexicon authored by Sarah Rees Brennan.

In April 2011, Arakawa began a series called Silver Spoon in Shogakukan's Weekly Shōnen Sunday. Rather than writing another fantasy series like Fullmetal Alchemist, Arakawa wanted to challenge herself by trying a more realistic story with Silver Spoon. It quickly rose among Shogakukan's best-selling titles and an anime series by A-1 Pictures began airing in July 2013. Also in July 2013 she began her manga adaptation of Yoshiki Tanaka's The Heroic Legend of Arslan series of novels in Kodansha's Bessatsu Shōnen Magazine.

Arakawa started the manga series Daemons of the Shadow Realm in Monthly Shōnen Gangan on December 10, 2021.

Influences
Arakawa states that Suihō Tagawa, the author of Norakuro, is the "root of [her] style as an artist". She also cites Rumiko Takahashi, Shigeru Mizuki, and Kinnikuman by Yudetamago as influences and is a fan of Mike Mignola's work. Reviewers consider Fullmetal Alchemist to have steampunk influences.

Works
 Stray Dog (1999)
  (2000)
  (2001–2010)
 Raiden-18 (2005–2021)
  (2006)
  (2006–2010)
  (2006–present)
  (2011–2019)
  (2013–present)
  (2021–present)

Awards
 1999: 9th 21st Century Enix Award for Stray Dog
 2003: 49th Shogakukan Manga Award, Shōnen category for Fullmetal Alchemist
 2011: 15th Tezuka Osamu Cultural Prize, "New Artist Prize" category.
 2011: 42nd Seiun Award, "Best Science Fiction Comic" category for Fullmetal Alchemist
 2012: 5th Manga Taishō Award for Silver Spoon
 2012: 58th Shogakukan Manga Award, Shōnen category for Silver Spoon

See also

References

External links

 
 "Arakawa Hiromu" (The Encyclopedia of Science Fiction entry by Jonathan Clements)

 
1973 births
20th-century Japanese women writers
21st-century Japanese women writers
Japanese female comics artists
Female comics writers
Japanese women artists
Women manga artists
Living people
Manga Taishō
Manga artists from Hokkaido
Winner of Tezuka Osamu Cultural Prize (New Artist Prize)
Pseudonymous artists
20th-century pseudonymous writers
21st-century pseudonymous writers
Women science fiction and fantasy writers
Japanese speculative fiction artists
Japanese speculative fiction writers